Winfield Junction is a junction between the Main Line and Port Washington Branch of the Long Island Rail Road in the Woodside section of Queens, New York City. Between 1854 and 1929, a station of the same name stood on this site.

History
Winfield Junction station was originally opened in July 1854 by the New York and Flushing Railroad on the southeast corner of 50th Avenue and 69th Street. The junction's location was set the same year, when the NY&F's Main Line (now the Port Washington Branch) was built, crossing the LIRR's Main Line. By 1868 NY&F was consolidated by the Flushing and North Side Railroad, and the section west of Winfield was sold to the South Side Railroad of Long Island in 1869. This segment was abandoned in 1875. After further acquisition by the Flushing, North Shore, and Central Railroad in 1874, and then the Long Island Rail Road in 1876, the station was later moved to the junction in August 1876 where it also served the Main Line. A second station was built at some point, which was razed in 1915, and replaced with a third station the same year. Plans to close the station can be traced as far back as 1910, but the station was closed and then razed in 1929, making Woodside Station the transfer point between Main Line and Port Washington Branch trains.

References

External links
Arrt's Arrchives
Flushing Railroad & Penny Bridge Station (with maps of the Junction)
North Shore Railroad (with New York & Flushing RR and Flushing & North Side RR tidbits)
Pride in Port: The Jekyll-Hyde Branch of the Long Island Railroad, Part One (Forgotten New York)
1967 image of former Winfield Tower (TrainsAreFun.com)

Long Island Rail Road
Former Long Island Rail Road stations in New York City
Transportation buildings and structures in Queens, New York
Railway stations in the United States opened in 1854
Railway stations closed in 1929
Rail junctions in the United States
Woodside, Queens
1854 establishments in New York (state)
1929 disestablishments in New York (state)